Podem Peak is the ice-covered peak of elevation 875 m in the southeast part of Basarbovo Ridge in Stribog Mountains on Brabant Island in the Palmer Archipelago, Antarctica.  It has steep and partly ice-free south slopes, and surmounts Malpighi Glacier to the southwest and Svetovrachene Glacier to the northeast.

The peak is named after the settlement of Podem in Northern Bulgaria.

Location
British mapping in 1980 and 2008.

Maps
 Antarctic Digital Database (ADD). Scale 1:250000 topographic map of Antarctica. Scientific Committee on Antarctic Research (SCAR). Since 1993, regularly upgraded and updated.

Notes

British Antarctic Territory. Scale 1:200000 topographic map. DOS 610 Series, Sheet W 64 62. Directorate of Overseas Surveys, Tolworth, UK, 1980.
Brabant Island to Argentine Islands. Scale 1:250000 topographic map. British Antarctic Survey, 2008.

References
 Bulgarian Antarctic Gazetteer. Antarctic Place-names Commission. (details in Bulgarian, basic data in English)
 Podem Peak. SCAR Composite Antarctic Gazetteer.

External links
 Podem Peak. Copernix satellite image

Mountains of the Palmer Archipelago
Bulgaria and the Antarctic